Lawrence Lipton (October 10, 1898 – July 9, 1975) was a Polish-born Jewish American journalist, writer, and Beat poet, as well as the father of James Lipton.

Early life
Lipton was born in Łódź, Poland, the son of Rose and Abraham Lipschitz. He immigrated to the United States in 1903 and settled in Chicago, Illinois.

Career 
Lipton began his career as a graphic artist and won an award for his illustration of a version of the Haggadah, the Passover seder liturgical text. He also worked as a journalist, writing for the Jewish Daily Forward and working for a movie theater as a publicity director.

During the 1920s, he associated with Chicago writers Edgar Lee Masters, Sherwood Anderson, Harriet Monroe, Ben Hecht, and Carl Sandburg. Lipton later wrote for Atlantic Monthly, The Quarterly Review of Literature, and the Chicago Review.  His other novels include Brother, The Laugh Is Bitter and In Secret Battle, as well as a poetry book, Rainbow at Midnight. His book, The Holy Barbarians (1959) linked Lipton to the Beats. He appeared in The Hypnotic Eye (1960) as "King of the Beatniks".

In the episode "Swan Song" on the show Gilmore Girls, Rory is showing Jess her copy of The Holy Barbarians by Lipton, and says that he is "the father of the guy that does those Actors Studio interviews on TV", to which Jess responds "It’s weird that a beatniky guy would have a conservative son like that."

The Holy Barbarians was also used as a band name for Holy Barbarians, a short-lived garage rock band from Liverpool, England, active from 1995 to 1997.

Personal life 
Lipton's first wife was Dorothy Omansky. He next married Betty Weinberg, a teacher; their son was Inside the Actors Studio host James Lipton. He was later married to author Craig Rice and Nettie Esther Brooks (from 1948 to 1975).

Lipton died in Los Angeles at the age of 76.

References

External links
Lawrence Lipton Papers Inventory
American Ethnography Quasimonthly | Excerpt from The Holy Barbarians

1898 births
1975 deaths
Writers from Chicago
20th-century American journalists
Polish emigrants to the United States
American male journalists
American people of Polish-Jewish descent
American male poets
Jewish American poets
20th-century American male writers
20th-century American non-fiction writers
20th-century American poets
Naturalized citizens of the United States
20th-century American Jews